The Quest Trio is a video game for the Nintendo DS. It was published by Activision in 2008.  The "Trio" part of the game's name refers to the 3 selectable games: Jewel Quest II: Jewel Quest Expeditions, Jewel Quest Solitaire, and Mah Jong Quest Expeditions.

Reception
IGN gave the game an 8.1 rating overall. Their highest sub rating was an 8.5 for "Lasting Appeal".

References

External links
Activision's US Site
Game Brains
Mistic Software
iWin

2008 video games
Activision games
Digital card games
Nintendo DS games
Nintendo DS-only games
Patience video games
Puzzle video games
Video games developed in Canada